Alpine skiing at the 2003 Asian Winter Games was held at the Owani Onsen Ski Area in Ōwani, Japan from 2 February to 7 February 2003.

Schedule

Medalists

Men

Women

Medal table

Participating nations
A total of 57 athletes from 13 nations competed in alpine skiing at the 2003 Asian Winter Games:

References
 Results of the Fifth Winter Asian Games

 
2003 Asian Winter Games events
2003
Asian Winter Games